Michael Ormonde Cleasby Sturt (born 12 September 1941) is an English businessman and cricketer.

Mike Sturt was born in Wembley, Middlesex. He played county cricket for Middlesex County Cricket Club in six separate seasons between 1961 and 1978, as a right-handed lower-order batsman and a highly efficient deputy wicketkeeper, for most of the period playing only when John Murray was not available through Test or other commitments. He was a member of Middlesex's championship-winning team of 1976 after Mike Brearley asked him to play when the county's other wicket-keepers became unavailable.

Sturt combined a successful business career in the City with his cricket. He was a longtime committee member for both Marylebone Cricket Club (MCC) and Middlesex. He has served as an MCC Trustee and as the County Chairman of Middlesex in 1993, before he suddenly resigned due to "a matter of principle".

References

External links
 

1941 births
Living people
English cricketers
Middlesex cricketers
Chairmen of Middlesex County Cricket Club
Cricketers from Wembley
Wicket-keepers
Businesspeople from London